Song Seon-mi (born 13 September 1974) is a South Korean actress.

Career
Song Seon-mi won second place at the Super Elite Model Contest in 1996, then transitioned from a modeling career to acting a year later in the television drama Model (1997).

In 1998, Song made her film debut playing dual roles as an art gallery employee and a soldier's ex-girlfriend in Lee Jeong-hyang's critically acclaimed romantic comedy Art Museum by the Zoo, opposite Ahn Sung-ki. This was followed by the gangster comedy My Boss, My Hero (2001). Though Song is more active in television, notable in her filmography are two arthouse films by auteur Hong Sang-soo. For Woman on the Beach (2006), she and her co-stars agreed to appear in the film even without reading Hong's script. While in The Day He Arrives (2011), Song played a film studies professor who frequents a bar in Bukchon.

Back on the small screen, her popularity rose when she played a young housewife in Precious Family (2004), written by Kim Soo-hyun. Leading roles followed in The Secret Lovers (2005), One Day Suddenly (2006), Green Coach (2009), Mrs. Town (2009), and Dandelion Family (2010), as well as a supporting role in the well-received medical drama Behind the White Tower (2007).

In 2012, Song was cast as a capable trauma nurse in Golden Time. She later reunited with its director Kwon Seok-jang in Miss Korea (2013), set in 1997 during the IMF crisis.

Song starred in her first ever period drama in 2013's Blooded Palace: The War of Flowers. She drew praise for her portrayal of the Crown Princess Lady Kang, Crown Prince Sohyeon's wife, despite controversy involving a breastfeeding scene.

Personal life
Song married art director Go Woo-seok, who she met through mutual acquaintances and dated for one year, on 29 June 2006. They have a daughter. On 21 August 2017, Go Woo-seok was murdered by a 28-year-old man during an argument.

In 2009, Song left talent agency Contents Entertainment to join a new agency set up by her former manager Mr. Yu, Hoya Entertainment; this resulted in a breach of contract lawsuit.

In January 2013, she was charged with slander for allegedly insulting Mr. Kim, CEO of Contents Entertainment, at a press conference for a drama held in July 2012.

Filmography

Television series

Film

Variety show

Theater

Book

Awards and nominations

References

External links
 
 

1974 births
Living people
20th-century South Korean actresses
21st-century South Korean actresses
L&Holdings artists
People from South Chungcheong Province
South Korean film actresses
South Korean stage actresses
South Korean television actresses